Cardinal Sin are an extreme metal band formed in 1995 by ex-Dissection member John Zwetsloot. In 1996, they released a 4-track EP called Spiteful Intents, which featured a trademark classical composition by Zwetsloot. Having disbanded after the EP, they reformed in 2003 with a partially new lineup, but have yet to release anything beyond Spiteful Intents.

Daniel Ekeroth described their musical style as "typical mid-90s death/thrash". Metal Hammer journalist Robert Müller wrote that since the group were focussed around the guitarists John Zwetsloot and Devo Andersson there were no doubts about the technical quality, though the EP's sound was "established and all to well-known".

Members

Line-up 
 Dan-Ola Persson - vocals
 John Zwetsloot - rhythm guitar
 Magnus "Devo" Andersson - lead guitar
 Alex Losbäck - bass
 Jocke Göthberg - drums

Discography 
Spiteful Intents EP - (1996)

Notes 

Swedish musical groups
Swedish black metal musical groups
Blackened death metal musical groups
Musical groups established in 1995
Musical groups disestablished in 2006
Musical quintets